Demi-soloist can have one of two meanings in the ballet. The first is for a solo rôle normally danced by a member of the corps de ballet. Such rôles are often made in pairs, that is, two corps dancers, dance together, frequently in mirror image.

Such dances are most commonly created for a pair of ballerinas but are occasionally made on (two or more) danseurs. Yet more rare are ballets with dances for one, two or more demi-soloist couples.

At a gala or other deluxe performance a company's soloists or principal dancers might dance demi  rôles.

The second meaning of demi-soloist is that of a rank in a ballet company, the English equivalent being second soloist. Such rank is more common in European companies, but the National Ballet of Canada and Houston Ballet have demi-soloists.

Footnotes 

Ballet occupations
Ballet terminology